Casorate Sempione is a comune (municipality) in the Province of Varese in the Italian region Lombardy, located  northwest of Milan and about  southwest of Varese.

Casorate Sempione borders the following municipalities: Arsago Seprio, Cardano al Campo, Gallarate, Somma Lombardo.

Demographic evolution

Culture

San Tito
In Casorate it is still celebrated the party of San Tito, that has been celebrated for the first time in 1926, in order to remember the XV centenary of the death of the martyr.
The party is revived every ten years for an amount of time of a couple of weeks. The last edition has taken place in September 2016.

Twin towns — sister cities
Casorate Sempione is twinned with:

  Saint-Étienne-de-Saint-Geoirs, France 
  Saint-Geoirs, France
  Saint-Michel-de-Saint-Geoirs, France

References

External links

 www.comune.casoratesempione.va.it 

Cities and towns in Lombardy